The Berwick Bay Bridge is a vertical lift bridge in the U.S. state of Louisiana which carries the BNSF Railway over the Atchafalaya River between Berwick and Morgan City. The bridge is primarily used for freight, but Amtrak runs the Sunset Limited three times weekely per direction over the line.

References

Railroad bridges in Louisiana
Vertical lift bridges in Louisiana
Buildings and structures in St. Mary Parish, Louisiana
BNSF Railway bridges
Union Pacific Railroad bridges